Saint Vincent and the Grenadines is divided into six parishes.

Five parishes (except Grenadines) are on the island of Saint Vincent, while the Grenadines Parish include the northern two-thirds of the Grenadines.

See also
 ISO 3166-2:VC
List of Caribbean First-level Subdivisions by Total Area
Commonwealth Local Government Forum-Americas

External links
 Parishes of Saint Vincent and the Grenadines, Statoids.com

 
Subdivisions of Saint Vincent and the Grenadines
Saint Vincent and the Grenadines, Parishes
Saint Vincent and the Grenadines 1
Parishes, Saint Vincent and the Grenadines
Saint Vincent and the Grenadines geography-related lists